Ferdinand Maximilian I of Isenburg-Wächtersbach was a German count of Isenburg-Wächtersbach from 1673 to 1703, and was the first of that county, (which was located near the center the Holy Roman Empire), and the father of Ferdinand Maximilian II of Isenburg-Wächtersbach. The county lasted from 1673 to 1806, until it was mediated to Isenburg.

Ancestry

References

Counts of Isenburg-Wächtersbach
1662 births
1703 deaths